The 2023 Nizhny Novgorod Oblast gubernatorial election will take place on 10 September 2023, on common election day. Incumbent Governor Gleb Nikitin is running to a second term in office.

Background
First Deputy Minister of Industry and Trade Gleb Nikitin was appointed acting Governor of Nizhny Novgorod Oblast in September 2017, replacing third-term Governor Valery Shantsev. Nikitin won the subsequent 2018 gubernatorial election with 67.75% of the vote over four opponents. Throughout Nikitin's first term rumours have spread about his potential promotion to the post of Minister of Industry and Trade of Russia, however, Governor Nikitin continuously denied allegations.

Candidates
In Nizhny Novgorod Oblast candidates for Governor can be nominated only by registered political parties, self-nomination is not possible. However, candidates are not obliged to be members of the nominating party. Candidate for Governor of Nizhny Novgorod Oblast should be a Russian citizen and at least 30 years old. Candidates for Governor should not have a foreign citizenship or residence permit. Each candidate in order to be registered is required to collect at least 7% of signatures of members and heads of municipalities. Also gubernatorial candidates present 3 candidacies to the Federation Council and election winner later appoints one of the presented candidates.

Declared
 Gleb Nikitin (United Russia), incumbent Governor of Nizhny Novgorod Oblast (2017–present)

Publicly expressed interest
 Dmitry Kuznetsov (SR–ZP), Member of State Duma (2021–present)

Potential
 Mikhail Delyagin (SR–ZP), Member of State Duma (2021–present)
 Tatyana Grinevich (SR–ZP), Member of Legislative Assembly of Nizhny Novgorod Oblast (2021–present)
 Vladimir Plyakin (New People), Member of State Duma (2021–present)
 Vladislav Yegorov (CPRF), Deputy Chairman of the Legislative Assembly of Nizhny Novgorod Oblast (2011–present), Member of Legislative Assembly (2006–present), 2018 gubernatorial candidate

See also
2023 Russian regional elections

References

Nizhny Novgorod Oblast
Nizhny Novgorod Oblast
Politics of Nizhny Novgorod Oblast